Bluewater Creek is a stream in northern Butler and southern 
Wayne counties in the U.S. state of Missouri. It is a tributary of Asher Creek.

The stream headwaters arise in Butler County at  about 2.5 miles northeast of Hendrickson.

Bluewater Creek was named for the blueish hue of its water.

See also
List of rivers of Missouri

References

Rivers of Butler County, Missouri
Rivers of Wayne County, Missouri
Rivers of Missouri